Microsoft Office 97 (version 8.0) is the fifth major release for Windows of Microsoft Office, released by Microsoft on November 19, 1996. It succeeded Microsoft Office 95 and was replaced by Microsoft Office 2000 in 1999. A Mac OS equivalent, Microsoft Office 98 Macintosh Edition, was released on January 6, 1998. Microsoft Office 97 became a major milestone release which includes hundreds of new features and improvements over its predecessor.

The suite is officially compatible with Windows NT 3.51 SP5, Windows 95 or later. It is not officially supported on Windows XP or later versions of Windows. It is the last version of Microsoft Office to support Windows NT 3.51 SP5 and Windows NT 4.0 RTM–SP2; as the following version, Microsoft Office 2000 only supports Windows 95, Windows NT 4.0 SP3 or later.

Two Service Releases (SR-1 and SR-2) were released for Office 97; SR-2 solved the year 2000 problem in Office 97.

Mainstream hotfix support for Office 97 ended on August 31, 2001, while extended hotfix support ended on February 28, 2002. Assisted support options and security updates for Office 97 ended on January 16, 2004.

Features
Office 97 introduced "Command Bars," a paradigm in which menus and toolbars were made more similar in capability and visual design. It also featured natural language systems and sophisticated grammar checking.

Microsoft Office 97 is the first version of Office to feature the Office Assistant, a feature designed to assist users by the way of an interactive animated character, which interfaced with the Office help content. The default assistant was "Clippit", nicknamed "Clippy", a paperclip. The Office Assistant feature was also included in its successor, Office 2000, as well as in Office XP (hidden by default) and 2003 (not installed by default), before being removed entirely in Office 2007.

Office 97 is also the first Microsoft product to include product activation, albeit limited to the Brazilian editions of Office 97 Small Business Edition and Publisher.

Two Office 97 applications featured easter eggs: Microsoft Word 97 contained a hidden pinball game and Microsoft Excel contained a hidden flight simulator.

Editions

Office 97 was released in five editions:

Notes

References

1997 software
Computer-related introductions in 1997
Office 97